Brian Mullan (died 3 September 2021) was an Irish Gaelic footballer who played in the 1958 All-Ireland Final. He was also chairman of Ballerin.

References

20th-century births
2021 deaths
Derry inter-county Gaelic footballers
Gaelic games club administrators
Year of birth missing
Place of birth missing